iFanzy is a personalized EPG that is being developed by Stoneroos, a Dutch Interactive Television Developer, in cooperation with the Eindhoven University of Technology. The personalized EPG provides the viewer with an offer of programs selected especially for this person, based on his or her personal interests and the mood he or she is in. iFanzy can be used next to the regular EPG. iFanzy is the result of a government subsidized project, led by Philips.

iFanzy has ceased operation, according to the site, due to the change in needs for the public.

The iFanzy TV Guide was introduced in 2009, and published in the Google Play Store and App Store.

References

External links
 iFanzy
 Stoneroos Interactive Television
 Technical University of Eindhoven

Digital television